The Lied Library building (pronounced LEED) is located on the University of Nevada's Las Vegas (UNLV) campus in Paradise, Nevada. It first opened on January 8, 2001. UNLV Libraries was established in 1957 and include the Lied Library that opened in 2001. Other campus libraries are the Architecture Studies Library, the Health Sciences Library, the Teacher Development & Resources Library, and the UNLV Music Library. UNLV Libraries has a collection of more than one million volumes, access to over 20,000 online and print journals, and more than 2 million additional resources of various media such as microfilm, DVDs, and government publications.

Special features

Lied Automated Storage and Retrieval 
The Lied Automated Storage and Retrieval (LASR) unit in Lied Library integrates industrial automated materials handling technologies with the online library catalog system to provide an innovative solution to long-term library storage. Three computer-controlled cranes provide access to bins full of stored materials. Library patrons access stored materials through the library catalog. The LASR operator receives the electronic request and activates the appropriate crane to retrieve the materials. LASR is designed to store approximately 600,000 volumes and can be expanded to handle an additional 600,000 volumes. Currently items such as older bound periodicals, lesser-used government publications, and microforms are stored in LASR.

Media Distribution System 
The Media and Computer Services Department in Lied Library provides viewing and listening capabilities for the media collection via an integrated video network system (Safari). This system allows the delivery of analog and digital media to library carrels, preview rooms, multimedia PCs, library classrooms, and conference rooms. The media distribution system is currently equipped to play back VHS, DVDs, CDs, audio cassettes and selected cable channels, and to receive satellite downlinks. This system frees the user from having to move from machine to machine and from physically handling all the equipment and materials, and it links beyond Lied Library and connects with selected branch libraries, conference rooms, and campus classrooms.

Digital ID 
Lied Library, Teacher Development and Resource Library and the Architecture Studies Library have implemented a state-of-the-art collection management system using the 3M Digital Materials Flow Management system. The system uses radio frequency identification (RFID), allowing staff to track, identify, and control library material more efficiently. The Digital ID technology is used in the Libraries' self-checkout stations and in the staff workstations to handle borrowing transactions. A hand held scanner is used by staff to rapidly check shelf order, to search for missing items, to perform inventories, and to record in-house use of most items. The Architecture Studies Library incorporated the same system during the summer of 2006.

Special Collections and Archives: Gaming 
Las Vegas is the premier gaming destination in the United States, and one of the premier destinations in the world. Special Collections and Archives at the Lied Library of the University of Nevada at Las Vegas houses the world’s largest and most comprehensive collection of gaming materials, including books, periodicals, visual materials and oral histories. The collection spans the history of gaming since the 16th century and focuses on gaming in Las Vegas and around the world. Resources include manuscripts dating back to the 16th century that trace the development of games, as well as many editions of Edmund Hoyle's games, from his original 1742 treatise on Whist, to the New Modern Hoyle.

The collection houses some of the corporate archives from some of the largest gaming corporations in the world. In 2003, Harrah’s donated its extensive corporate archive of letters, memos, newsletters, photographs, etc.   Other collections include corporate material from MGM, Boyd Gaming, and Binion’s Horseshoe. Going beyond the industry itself, the collection houses architectural drawings of current, past and never-built casinos. It also includes the corporate papers of the iconic Las Vegas neon signs, most of which were built by the Young Electric Sign Company. The company’s papers include sketches, designs and photographs of many of these signs.  (As an aside, many of these original signs can be found at The Neon Museum, Las Vegas.) 

The collection not only serves researchers and those interested in the history of gaming, but also serves the Las Vegas gaming business community, providing extensive data collection and analysis used by many gaming executives. This data is essential as it provides a look at trends which will affect the industry in the coming months. 

In order to promote awareness, Special Collections has turned to technology, incorporating a “What’s New” RSS feed into the site and turning to social media. It currently has a dedicated Facebook presence, “UNLV Special Collections and Archives” which largely includes the same material as the RSS feed. Other tools include a Google like search tool, Web 2.0 integration and patron feedback features.

Notes

External links 
 UNLV Libraries webpage
 UNLV Teacher Development & Resources Library
 UNLV Special Collections
 UNLV Architecture Studies Library
 UNLV Music Library
UNLV Health Sciences Library
 UNLV Digital Collections
 UNLV Libraries - A Brief History
 Lied Library Construction Photo Archive
 Lied Library Mission and Vision Statement

References
 Starkweather, Wendy. University Libraries Fact Sheet. University of Nevada, Las Vegas, University Libraries. Last updated: Sept 7, 2005.  Accessed: June 4, 2007.
 Chung, Su Kim. UNLV Libraries - A Brief History Accessed: June 4, 2007.

2001 establishments in Nevada
Buildings and structures in Paradise, Nevada
Libraries in Nevada
Library buildings completed in 2001
University and college academic libraries in the United States
University of Nevada, Las Vegas